The Violets – for spiritual politics is a political party in Germany.

Ideology
The members of the party see themselves as representatives of spiritual people. Accordingly, the "spirituality" occupies a central place in the party's views. In terms of content, it focuses on domestic issues, particularly in the areas of education, upbringing, business, finance, work and the environment.

Nature conservation is one of the focal points. The party also rejects animal experiments and advocates forms of direct democracy. The violets also demand an unconditional basic income. The main goal, according to the party, is to develop a society in which "everyone can think, feel and act from their level of consciousness and develop to a higher level of consciousness". The Violets also advocate the legalization of illegal drugs while strengthening education and addiction prevention and justify this with a right to self-determination.

The party tries to form a dual leadership of a man and a woman at federal and state level.

References

External links
 

2001 establishments in Germany
Political parties established in 2001
Political parties in Germany
Universal basic income in Germany
Western spiritually leaning parties
Political parties supporting universal basic income